Coenraad is a Dutch given name. Notable persons with that name include:

Coenraad van Beuningen (1622–1693), diplomat for Dutch Republic
Coenraad Beyers (1893–1975), South African historian, archivist, and herald
Coenraad Bloemendal (born 1946), Canadian cellist
Coenraad Bron (1937–2006), Dutch computer scientist who worked with Edsger W. Dijkstra on Algol-68
Coenraad de Buys (1761–1821), Cape Colony cattle raider
Hasselt (1797–1823), Dutch physician, zoologist, botanist and mycologist
Coenraad Hiebendaal (1879–1921), Dutch rower who competed in the 1900 Summer Olympics
Coenraad Johannes van Houten (1801–1887), Dutch chemist and chocolate maker
Barend Coenraad Petrus Jansen (1884–1962), Dutch chemist and biochemist who isolated vitamin B1
Coenraad Jacob Temminck (1778–1858), Dutch aristocrat and zoologist

See also 
 Coen (disambiguation)
 Koenraad
 Conrad (name)

Masculine given names
Dutch masculine given names